MS 13 may refer to:

Mara Salvatrucha (MS-13) is a criminal street gang in North, Central, and South America
Mississippi Highway 13, a state highway in Mississippi, United States
Minuscule 13, a Greek minuscule manuscript of the New Testament
Soyuz MS-13, a Soyuz spaceflight launched on 20 July 2019 to the International Space Station